The 2018 Manila Stars season is the 1st season of the franchise in the Maharlika Pilipinas Basketball League (MPBL).

Key dates
 June 12, 2018: Regular Season Begins.

Roster

Datu Cup

Standings

Game log

|- style="background:#bfb;"
| 1
| June 16
| Bataan
| W 89–82
| Aristotle Dionisio (21)
| Aristotle Dionisio (7)
| Roger Yap (11)
| San Andres Sports Complex
| 1–0
|- style="background:#fcc;"
| 2
| June 28
| Makati
| L 98–99
| Christoper Bitoon (24)
| Aristoltle Dionisio (6)
| Marcy Arellano (6)
| Ynares Center
| 1–1

|- style="background:#bfb;"
| 3
| July 11
| Valenzuela
| W 89–84
| Reil Cervantes (24)
| Aristotle Dionisio (13)
| Christopher Bitoon (6)
| Filoil Flying V Centre
| 2–1
|- style="background:#bfb;"
| 4
| July 24
| Cebu City
| W 107–76
| Cervantes, Dionisio (19)
| Three players (6)
| Roger Yap (7)
| Cuneta Astrodome
| 3–1

|- style="background:#bfb;"
| 5
| August 4
| @ Pampanga
| W 100–75
| Christopher Bitoon (22)
| Roger Yap (9)
| Christopher Bitoon (9)
| Angeles University Foundation Gymnasium
| 4–1
|- style="background:#bfb;"
| 6
| August 16
| Bulacan
| W 84–62
| Reil Cervantes (19)
| Maclean Sabellina (11)
| Roger Yap (8)
| San Andres Sports Complex
| 5–1
|- style="background:#bfb;"
| 7
| August 29
| Pasay
| W 115–85
| Reil Cervantes (22)
| Maclean Sabellina (7)
| Hayes, Laude (5)
| San Andres Sports Complex
| 6–1

|-style="background:#bfb;"
| 8
| September 11
| Caloocan
| W 95–68
| Aristotle Dionisio (24)
| Aristotle Dionisio (10)
| Roger Yap (9)
| Ynares Center
| 7–1
|-style="background:#fcc;"
| 9
| September 19
| Laguna
| L 68–74
| Aristotle Dionisio (17)
| Aristotle Dionisio (15)
| Christopher Bitoon (6)
| Cuneta Astrodome
| 7–2
|-style="background:#bfb;"
| 10
| September 26
| Mandaluyong
| W 92–73
| Reil Cervantes (25)
| Aristotle Dionisio (9)
| Roger Yap (7)
| San Andres Sports Complex
| 8–2

|-style="background:#bfb;"
| 11
| October 10
| @ Muntinlupa
| W 100–86
| Marvin Hayes (18) 
| Aristotle Dionisio (20) 
| Reil Cervantes (9)
| Muntinlupa Sports Complex
| 9–2
|-style="background:#bfb;"
| 12
| October 27
| @ Zamboanga
| W 60–59
| Reil Cervantes (21)
| Marvin Hayes (11)
| Marcy Arellano (4)
| Mayor Vitaliano D. Agan Coliseum
| 10–2

|-style="background:#bfb;"
| 13
| November 6
| Parañaque
| W 98–88
| Christopher Bitoon (22)
| Marvin Hayes (19)
| Marcy Arellano (7)
| Valenzuela Astrodome
| 11–2
|-style="background:#bfb;"
| 14
| November 14
| @ Quezon City
| W 76–71
| Christopher Bitoon (26) 
| Christopher Bitoon (11)
| Christopher Bitoon (7)
| JCSGO Seed Dome
| 12–2
|-style="background:#fcc;"
| 15
| November 21
| @ San Juan
| L 80–84 (OT)
| Reil Cervantes (24)
| Three players (8)
| Marcy Arellano (9)
| Filoil Flying V Centre
| 12–3
|-style="background:#bfb;"
| 16
| November 29
| Basilan
| W 79–67
| Christopher Bitoon (26)
| Roger Yap (11)
| Christopher Bitoon (7)
| San Andres Sports Complex
| 13–3

|-style="background:#bfb;"
| 17
| December 10
| General Santos
| W 63–57
| Christopher Bitoon (22)
| Mark Niel Cruz (16)
| Roger Yap (7)
| Bataan People's Center
| 14–3
|-style="background:#bfb;"
| 18
| December 19
| @ Batangas City
| W 80–79
| Reil Cervantes (24)
| Aristotle Dionisio (11)
| Roger Yap (6)
| Batangas City Coliseum
| 15–3

|-style="background:#bfb;"
| 19
| January 7
| Rizal
| W 71–70
| Aristotle Dionisio (20)
| Aristotle Dionisio (14)
| Marcy Arellano (7)
| Bataan People's Center
| 16–3
|-style="background:#fcc;"
| 20
| January 14
| Bacoor
| L 86–92
| Aristotle Dionisio (22)
| Reil Cervantes (8)
| Marcy Arellano (12)
| Olivares College Gymnasium
| 16–4
|-style="background:#bfb;"
| 21
| January 22
| Pasig
| W 111–98
| Christopher Bitoon (18)
| Jhygruz Vence Laude (8)
| Marcy Arellano (15)
| San Andres Sports Complex
| 17–4

|-style="background:#bfb;"
| 22
| February 1
| Imus
| W 69–68
| Reil Cervantes (16)
| Marcy Arellano (10)
| Marcy Arellano (9)
| San Andres Sports Complex
| 18–4
|-style="background:#bfb;"
| 23
| February 7
| Marikina
| W 91–89
| Bitoon, Hayes (19)
| Marvin Hayes (basketball) (10)
| Mac Montilla (9)
| Muntinlupa Sports Complex
| 19–4
|-style="background:#fcc;"
| 24
| February 19
| Navotas
| L 92–96
| Christopher Bitoon (28)
| Maclean Sabellina (6)
| Arellano, Bitoon (9)
| San Andres Sports Complex
| 19–5
|-style="background:#bfb;"
| 25
| February 26
| Davao Occidental
| W 89–88
| Bitoon, Dionisio (17)
| Christopher Bitoon (7)
| Marcy Arellano (11)
| San Andres Sports Complex
| 20–5

Playoffs

Brackets

Game log

|- style="background:#bfb;"
| 1
| March 12
| Bulacan
| W 69–65
| 
| 
| 
|
| 
|- style="background:#bfb;"
| 2
| March 20
| Bulacan
| W 92–83
| 
| 
| 
| 
| 

|- style="background:#fcc;"
| 3
| March 26
| Bataan
| L 72–73
| 
| 
| 
|
| 
|- style="background:#bfb;"
| 4
| March 28
| Bataan
| W 80–76
|
| 
| 
|
| 
|- style="background:#bfb;"
| 5
| April 1
| Bataan
| W 56–51
|
| 
| 
|
| 

|- style="background:#bfb;"
| 6
| April 4
| San Juan
| W 88–91
| 
| 
| 
| Filoil Flying V Centre
| 
|- style="background:#fcc;"
| 7
| April 6
| San Juan
| L 90–92
|
| 
|
| San Andres Sports Complex
| 
|- style="background:#fcc;"
| 8
| April 8
| San Juan
| L 74–85
|
| 
|
| Filoil Flying V Centre
|

References

Manila Stars Season, 2018